Mohamed Halibi (born 1 July 1956) is a Lebanese boxer. He competed at the 1980 Summer Olympics and the 1984 Summer Olympics. At the 1980 Summer Olympics, he lost to Zhelyu Stefanov of Bulgaria.

References

1956 births
Living people
Lebanese male boxers
Olympic boxers of Lebanon
Boxers at the 1980 Summer Olympics
Boxers at the 1984 Summer Olympics
Place of birth missing (living people)
Light-middleweight boxers